Bozhidar Dimitrov Stoyanov (3 December 1945 – 1 July 2018) was a Bulgarian historian, politician, and polemicist in the sphere of Medieval Bulgarian history, the Ottoman rule of Bulgaria and the Macedonian Question. He was director of the National Historical Museum, formerly a Bulgarian Socialist Party member, and later became affiliated with the Citizens for European Development of Bulgaria (GERB) political party.

Biography
Born in Sozopol to a family of Bulgarian refugees from Eastern Thrace (now part of Turkey), he was given access to the Vatican Secret Archives in the 1980s, regarded as a great achievement considered the political situation of the time. As the director of the National Historical Museum, he had an indirect conflict in 1997–1998 with the President Petar Stoyanov regarding whether to return the Istoriya Slavyanobolgarskaya rough copy to the Zograf Monastery or leave it in Bulgaria.

Being a member of the Supreme Party Council of BSP, he declared himself openly against the party in 2005 by not supporting BSP Mayor of Sofia candidate Tatyana Doncheva and instead favouring the independent Boyko Borisov. Because of this he was taken down from the post of BSP municipal councillors leader in Sofia. Before the 2009 Bulgarian parliamentary election, Dimitrov formally left BSP and joined Borisov's GERB. He was the party's candidate for 2nd MMC – Burgas in the first-past-the-post vote and won the election with 35.92%. He finished ahead of Volen Siderov, the leader of the nationalist Attaka.

Dimitrov is the author of 30 treatises and over 250 articles and papers in the sphere of his research, as well as several books (including The Ten Lies of Macedonism and Twelve Myths in Bulgarian History). He has specialized in palaeography in Paris and also hosts the patriotic history-related Pamet Balgarska (Bulgarian Memory) show on Kanal 1.

Dimitrov believes that the Bulgars played a more important role in the formation of the contemporary Bulgarians as a people than previously believed.

He was Minister without portfolio responsible for Bulgarians abroad in the GERB government (July 2009 – February 2011).

Controversy
Although serious researchers maintain that Dimitrov’s views on Bulgarian history are biased and can be partially challenged, they are popular in Bulgaria and he enjoys credibility among nationalist intellectuals. Dimitrov was a collaborator of Bulgaria's communist-era security service.

The Ten Lies of Macedonism

Bozhidar Dimitrov's book, The Ten Lies of Macedonism (2000, 2003 and 2007), is a polemical pamphlet, based on historical documents, and is openly against the ideology of "Macedonism", i.e. the form of ethnic Macedonian nationalism that asserts an "allegedly deep-rooted ethnic and cultural distinction" between ethnic Macedonians and Bulgarians. The book has caused considerable controversy and criticism from ethnic Macedonian sources. Dimitrov claims that it has reached best-seller status in the Republic of Macedonia. The "10 lies" described by Dimitrov are:

First lie: the notion that contemporary ethnic Macedonians are descendants of ancient Macedonians.
Second lie: ethnic Macedonians are "pure Slavs" distinct from Bulgarians, who are "Tatars".
Third lie: medieval figures like Saints Cyril and Methodius were ethnic Macedonians.
Fourth lie: Samuel of Bulgaria was an ethnic Macedonian and the First Bulgarian Empire was a "Macedonian" state.
Fifth lie: the Archbishopric of Ohrid was a "Macedonian" church.
Sixth lie: the Bulgarian Exarchate conquered the ethnic Macedonian people.
Seventh lie: early 20th-century revolutionary movements such as the Internal Macedonian Revolutionary Organization (IMRO) worked for a "Macedonian" national goal.
Eighth lie: that Krste Misirkov is the number 1 ethnic Macedonian of the 20th century.
Ninth lie: the "heroic struggle of the Macedonian people against Bulgarian occupiers in 1941–1944".
Tenth lie: on the rejoicing of the Macedonian people for their second inclusion in Yugoslavia in 1944 and the 250,000 ethnic Macedonians in Bulgaria.

Publications
 Bozhidar Dimitrov. The True History of Liberation 1860–1878.  Sofia: Standart News Ltd., 2010.  183 pp.  (First edition in 2006, .) 
 Bozhidar Dimitrov, co-author. Bulgarian Policies on the Republic of Macedonia: Recommendations on the development of good neighbourly relations following Bulgaria’s accession to the EU and in the context of NATO and EU enlargement in the Western Balkans.  Sofia: Manfred Wörner Foundation, 2008. 80 pp.  (Trilingual publication in Bulgarian, Macedonian and English)
 Bozhidar Dimitrov.  The Ten Lies of Macedonism. Sofia: Kom Foundation, 2007. 107 pp.  (First edition in 2000 in Bulgarian, .)
 Bozhidar Dimitrov.  Macedonia – Holy Bulgarian Land: Who Are the Successors of Alexander the Great and Roxana?  Sofia: Kom Foundation, 2007.  80 pp.  
 Bozhidar Dimitrov.  Seven Ancient Civilizations in Bulgaria: With Maps & Color Illustrations. Sofia: Kom Foundation, 2006. 112 pp. 
 Bozhidar Dimitrov.  12 Myths in Bulgarian History. Sofia, Kom Foundation, 2005. 148 pp.  
 Bozhidar Dimitrov.  Bulgarians: The First Europeans.  Sofia: St. Kliment Ohridsky University Press, 2002. 108 pp. 
 Bozhidar Dimitrov.  Bulgaria and the Vatican.  Sofia: Bulgarian Diplomatic Review, 2002. 56 pp. 
 Bozhidar Dimitrov.  The Bulgars and Alexander of Macedon. Sofia: Tangra Publishers, 2001. 138 pp.  
 Bozhidar Dimitrov.  Venetian Documents on Bulgarian History During the 16th and 17th Century.  Sofia: Borina Ltd., 1994.

Honours
Dimitrov Cove in Antarctica is named after Bozhidar Dimitrov.

References

Notes

1945 births
2018 deaths
People from Sozopol
20th-century Bulgarian historians
Government ministers of Bulgaria
Bulgarian socialists
Bulgarians from Eastern Thrace
Historians of the Balkans
21st-century Bulgarian historians